, , or  is a lake on the border of Norway and Sweden. The Norwegian side lies in Rana Municipality in Nordland county and the Swedish side lies in Storuman Municipality in Västerbotten County.

See also
 List of lakes in Norway
 Geography of Norway

References

Rana, Norway
Lakes of Nordland
Norway–Sweden border
International lakes of Europe
Lakes of Västerbotten County